USS DeLong (DE-684) was a  during World War II and the Cold War.

Namesake
Weldon Fader DeLong was born on 18 September 1916 in Baras Corner, Nova Scotia, Canada. He enlisted in the United States Marine Corps on 20 September 1940. He was killed in action at Point Cruz, Guadalcanal on 3 November 1942. Corporal DeLong was posthumously awarded the Navy Cross.

Construction and service 
She was built at Quincy, Massachusetts, launched on 23 November 1943 and commissioned on 31 December 1943.

During World War II DeLong served primarily as a training ship for officers and men that were about to embark on ships assigned to anti-submarine warfare (ASW) duties. In early 1946 DeLong was decommissioned and assigned to the Reserve Fleet at Green Cove Springs, Florida. Following the outbreak of the Korean War, DeLong was reactivated and on 7 February 1951 was again commissioned.

After a short training period DeLong was assigned to Escort Squadron Eight, Destroyer Force, U.S. Atlantic Fleet. During this period of service DeLong participated in several Fleet Exercises and Midshipmen Cruises. In addition to routine fleet support missions, DeLong often served as a training ship for the Fleet Sonar School, Key West, Florida. On 3 January 1958, DeLong was assigned Group II status, joining the newly formed Reserve ASW Program in the 3d Naval District.

During the Berlin Crisis of 1960–1961, DeLong was assigned to the U.S. Atlantic Fleet as part of Escort Squadron 18 and homeported in Newport, Rhode Island. During this period DeLong operated extensively in the Caribbean area. On 1 August 1961, DeLong resumed her Group II status, operating under Commander, Naval Reserve Destroyer Division, 3d Naval District. Stationed at Fort Schuyler Naval Reserve base located in the Bronx, New York, 10465.

DeLong was decommissioned and struck from naval records in the late 1960s and was sunk as a target on 19 February 1970.

Military awards and honors

Scale Model
A 1/300 scale plastic model kit of the USS Delong was made by the Lindberg scale model company.

See also
 List of destroyer escorts of the United States Navy

References

Sources
 
 
  NavSource Online

External links
 DeLong family at DE-684's christening 
 USS DeLong at history.navy.mil, archived at archive.org

 

Rudderow-class destroyer escorts
Ships built in Quincy, Massachusetts
1943 ships